Quadruple Alliance may refer to:

  The October 1673 alliance between the Dutch Republic, Emperor Leopold, Spain, and Charles IV, Duke of Lorraine, during the Franco-Dutch War.
 The 1718 alliance between Austria, France, the Netherlands, and Great Britain during the War of the Quadruple Alliance.
 The Treaty of Warsaw (1745) between Great Britain, Austria, the Netherlands, and Saxony (the Quadruple Alliance) to uphold the Pragmatic Sanction, allowing Maria Theresa to succeed to the Habsburg dominions. 
 The Quadruple Alliance (1815) between the United Kingdom, Austria, Prussia, and Russia following the Napoleonic Wars.
 The 1834 Quadruple Alliance between the United Kingdom, France, Spain, and Portugal to enforce the Concession of Evoramonte.
 The Quadruple Alliance (1912-1913), also known as the Balkan League, representing a system of alliances between Bulgaria, Greece, Montenegro and Serbia
 The Quadruple Alliance (1915-1918), formed when Bulgaria joined the other three Central Powers of World War I (Germany, Austria-Hungary, and the Ottoman Empire).
 The major Allies of World War II: the United States, Great Britain, China, and the USSR, dubbed the "Big Four" or the "Four Policemen".
 In Harry Turtledove's Southern Victory Series, set in an alternate reality where the Confederate States win the American Civil War, a Quadruple Alliance (the United States, Germany, Austria-Hungary and the Ottoman Empire), fights in an alternate Great War (1914-1917) against the Quadruple Entente (the Confederate States, Great Britain, France and Russia).

See also 
 Triple Alliance (disambiguation)
 Quintuple Alliance